The Serie B di pallamano maschile is the third division of the Italian water polo male national championship.

The tournament involved 40 teams, which are divided into four groups consisting of ten teams. At the end of the regular season the top two teams of each group participating in the stage of the play-off, from which four winners emerge that achieve promotion to Serie A2. The teams ranked in tenth place of each group directly recede and are reached by the teams defeated in the play-out, attended the eighth and ninth classified, for a total of eight relegation to Serie C.

References

Ita
Water polo competitions in Italy
Water